Seafarers' Annual Leave with Pay Convention, 1976 is  an International Labour Organization Convention.

It was established in 1976, with the preamble stating:
Having decided upon the adoption of certain proposals with regard to revision of the Paid Vacations (Seafarers) Convention (Revised), 1949 (No. 91), in the light of, but not necessarily restricted to, the Holidays with Pay Convention (Revised), 1970 (No. 132), ...

Modification 
The convention revised Convention C91, Paid Vacations (Seafarers) Convention (Revised), 1949 (shelved).

Ratifications
As of 2023, the convention had been ratified by 17 states. Subsequently, 14 of the ratifying states have denounced the treaty.

External links 
Text.
Ratifications.

Leave of absence
International Labour Organization conventions
Treaties concluded in 1976
Treaties entered into force in 1979
Treaties of Brazil
Treaties of Cameroon
Treaties of Germany
Treaties of Ba'athist Iraq
Treaties of Italy
Treaties of Kenya
Treaties of Nicaragua
Treaties of Portugal
Treaties of Turkey
Admiralty law treaties
Treaties extended to French Guiana
Treaties extended to French Polynesia
Treaties extended to Guadeloupe
Treaties extended to Martinique
Treaties extended to New Caledonia
Treaties extended to Réunion
Treaties extended to Saint Pierre and Miquelon
Treaties extended to Aruba
1976 in labor relations